Daniel Thomas Scannell Jr. (November 17, 1912 - February 19, 2000) was a policeman, attorney, and business executive who held numerous positions in the Metropolitan Transportation Authority in New York State over a 45-year tenure.

Early life
Scannell was born in the Bronx, New York to Daniel T. (d. 1939) and Eleanor (née Walsh) Scannell. He attended Fordham University, earning an undergraduate degree in accounting in 1935, and earned a law degree from Fordham University School of Law in 1940.

Career

Personal

References

Fordham University alumni
Fordham University School of Law alumni
Long Island Rail Road people
Executives of Metropolitan Transportation Authority (New York)
Metro-North Railroad
People from Queens, New York
People from the Bronx
1912 births
2000 deaths